How the World Was One: Beyond the Global Village is Arthur C. Clarke's history and survey of the communications revolution, published in 1992. The title includes an intentional pun; in English How the World Was Won would sound exactly the same. 

This work is based on an earlier work by Clarke entitled Voice Across the Sea, published in 1958.

References

External links 
 

1992 non-fiction books
Books by Arthur C. Clarke
Victor Gollancz Ltd books
Communication